Phytoecdysteroids are plant-derived ecdysteroids.  Phytoecdysteroids are a class of chemicals that plants synthesize for defense against phytophagous (plant eating) insects. These compounds are mimics of hormones used by arthropods in the molting process known as ecdysis. When insects eat the plants with these chemicals they may prematurely molt, lose weight, or suffer other metabolic damage and die.

Chemically, phytoecdysteroids are classed as triterpenoids, the group of compounds that includes triterpene saponins, phytosterols, and phytoecdysteroids. Plants, but not animals, synthesize phytoecdysteroids from mevalonic acid in the mevalonate pathway of the plant cell using acetyl-CoA as a precursor.

Over 250 ecdysteroid analogs have been identified so far in plants, and it has been theorized that there are over 1,000 possible structures which might occur in nature.  Many more plants have the ability to "turn on" the production of phytoecdysteroids when under stress, animal attack or other conditions.

The term phytoecdysteroid can also apply to ecdysteroids found in fungi, even though fungi are not plants.

Some plants or fungi that produce phytoecdysteroids include Achyranthes bidentata, Tinospora cordifolia, Pfaffia paniculata, Leuzea carthamoides, Rhaponticum uniflorum, Serratula coronata, Cordyceps, and Asparagus.

See also
 Plant defense against herbivory

References

Phytochemicals
Steroids
Insect ecology
Chemical ecology